Minja Vojvodic (31 August 1942 – 17 June 2014) was a Montenegrin actor. He appeared in more than ninety films from 1965 to 2009.

Filmography

References

External links 

1942 births
2014 deaths
People from Kolašin
Montenegrin male actors